Southampton Aerodrome  is located  east of Southampton, Ontario, Canada.

References

Registered aerodromes in Ontario
Transport in Bruce County
Buildings and structures in Bruce County